Federal elections were held in Switzerland on 26 October 1899. The Free Democratic Party retained its majority in the National Council.

Electoral system
The 147 members of the National Council were elected in 52 single- and multi-member constituencies using a three-round system. Candidates had to receive a majority in the first or second round to be elected; if it went to a third round, only a plurality was required. Voters could cast as many votes as there were seats in their constituency. There was one seat for every 20,000 citizens, with seats allocated to cantons in proportion to their population.

Results
Voter turnout was highest in Schaffhausen (where voting was compulsory) at 86.4% and lowest in Obwalden at 21.3%.

By constituency

References

1899
Switzerland
1899 in Switzerland
October 1899 events